Hydrovatus picipennis, is a species of predaceous diving beetle found in India,  Sri Lanka, Indonesia, Philippines, China and Thailand.

Body elongated with a typical length of about 3.0 and 4.2 mm and the apex of elytra is distinct. Penis apex is broad, which narrows abruptly to a slender tip. In male, the ridges of stridulatory file is larger, and clearly discernible. Male protarsal claws are not distinctly thickened.

References 

Dytiscidae
Insects of Sri Lanka
Insects described in 1859